The Trendak Tercel is a Polish autogyro designed and produced by Aviation Artur Trendak of Jaktorów-Kolonia, Poland, introduced at the AERO Friedrichshafen show in 2014. The aircraft is supplied complete and ready-to-fly.

Design and development
The Tercel is one of three similar designs that were all unveiled at the same time and which share common components. The Twistair is a tandem development, while the Trooper is a military variant with sideways facing seats for troop transport.

The Tercel features a single main rotor, a two-seats-in side-by-side configuration in  completely enclosed cockpit with a windshield, tricycle landing gear with wheel pants and a four cylinder, air-cooled, turbocharged, intercooled, twin carburetor, four-stroke,  CA 912 ULT (RST) engine in pusher configuration.

The aircraft fuselage is made from composite material.

Specifications (Tercel)

See also
List of rotorcraft

References

External links

Tercel
2010s Polish sport aircraft
Single-engined pusher autogyros
Twin-boom aircraft